Albert Lawrence West (1825 - 1892), known as A. L. West, was an American architect based in Richmond, Virginia. His work is in Virginia and North Carolina and includes the Pasquotank County Courthouse (1883) in Elizabeth City, North Carolina. He began his career as a carpenter and builder. He worked as an engineer and architect for the Confederacy during the American Civil War. As an architect he designed several Methodist churches. He wrote The Architect and Builder's Vade-Mecum and Book of Reference in 1871. He became a fellow in the American Institute of Architects (FAIA) towards the end of his career and was the first native Virginian so honored. His son William C. West (1870-1950) was also an architect.

Works
 Manchester Courthouse (Richmond, Virginia) at 920 Hull Street (1871)  
 Centenary Church (Richmond, Virginia)
 Monumental Methodist Church Portsmouth, Virginia
 Trinity Methodist Church (Richmond, Virginia) at 2006 East Broad Street (1860). The church site includes a historical marker. The congregation relocated to Henrico County in 1945. The church building is still standing.

See also
National Register of Historic Places listings in Richmond, Virginia

References

Architects from Richmond, Virginia
Fellows of the American Institute of Architects
1825 births
1892 deaths
19th-century American architects